Florian Janits (born 21 January 1998) is an Austrian racing driver currently competing in the TCR International Series. Having previously competed in the ADAC Formula 4 & Formula Renault 1.6 NEC amongst others.

Racing career
Janits began his career in 2007 in Karting, he raced there for many seasons up until 2013. In 2013 he switched to the Formula Renault 1.6 NEC championship, he raced there for two seasons and finished 3rd in the championship in 2014, taking 5 podiums, 2 pole positions and 1 victory. He switched to the ADAC Formula 4 championship for 2015, finishing within the top 16 in most of the races he took part in.

In May 2016 it was announced that he would race in the TCR International Series, driving a Volkswagen Golf GTI TCR for Liqui Moly Team Engstler.

Racing record

Career Summary

Complete TCR International Series results
(key) (Races in bold indicate pole position) (Races in italics indicate fastest lap)

References

External links
 
 
 

1998 births
Living people
Austrian racing drivers
TCR International Series drivers
ADAC Formula 4 drivers
Walter Lechner Racing drivers
GT4 European Series drivers
Engstler Motorsport drivers